Mykhailo Deyak (born 14 February 1984 in Zolotarevo, Zakarpattia Oblast) is a Ukrainian painter working in the modern Transcarpathian School of painting. The basic elements of Deyak’s works are the expressions. The freshness of his impressions is conveyed through the range of colors presented in his works.

Education 
1999-2003 –he had been studying and then had graduated from Adalbert Erdeli's Uzhgorod College of Art.
He was practicing under National artist of Ukraine V. Mykyta.
From year 2003 – he became a student of National Academy of fine arts and architecture. He worked the landscape workshop of Professor V. Zabashta, taught by the assistant professor I. Melnychuk.

Exhibitions 

2*00 - «The exhibition of Young», the gallery «Uzhgorod», Ukraine
2002 - «Carpathians», Bokshay Museum, Uzhgorod, Ukraine
2002 - «Transcarpathian painting», Budapest, Hungary
2006 - «Spring opening day», the gallery «Lavra», Kyiv, Ukraine
2006 - «Ukrainian and Russian painting of the XIX-XX centuries», the auction house «The Golden section», the gallery «Lavra», Kyiv, Ukraine
2007 - «Diploma papers and creative works of the landscape painting studio graduates (1996-2006)», the exhibition hall NAOMA, Kyiv, Ukraine
2007 - «Ukrainian painting of the XX century», the auction house «The Golden section», the gallery «Lavra», Kyiv, Ukraine
2008 - «Ukrainian painting and graphic arts of the XIX-XX centuries», the auction house «The Golden section», the gallery «Lavra», Kyiv, Ukraine
2008 – The group exhibition of the gallery "KUMF", Toronto, Canada
2009 - «Collection painting and icon painting», the auction house «Korners», auction №11, 19.09.09, Kyiv, Ukraine
2009 - «Collection painting and icon painting», the auction house «Korners»,  auction №12, 19.12.09, Kyiv, Ukraine
2010 - «Collection painting and icon painting», the auction house «Korners»,  auction №14, 18.09.10, Kyiv, Ukraine
2011 - «Ukrainian classical painting and graphic arts of the XX century», the auction house «The Golden section», the exhibition centre «М17», Kyiv, Ukraine
2011 - Fine Art Ukraine 2011, Art arsenal, exhibition stand of the gallery "Mystetska Zbirka", Kyiv, Ukraine
2012 – Group exhibition “Days Ukraine in China”, Shanghai Theatre Academy, Shanghai, China
2012 – Group exhibition “Cities of the world”, The gallery "Mystetska Zbirka", Kyiv, Ukraine
2012 - «Collection painting and icon painting», the auction house «Korners», №23 - 22.12.2012, Kyiv, Ukraine
2013 – Group exhibition “Winter”, The gallery "Mystetska Zbirka", Kyiv, Ukraine
2013 –  Auction exhibition, 11.04.2013, Contemporary Art Day Sale, Auction House Phillips, London, Great Britain

Personal exhibitions 

2007 –The art-cafe «Antresol», Kyiv, Ukraine
2007 – The gallery "Cobalt", Kyiv, Ukraine
2008 – The gallery "Cobalt", Kyiv, Ukraine
2008 -"Art-Kyiv", Ukrainian house, Kyiv, Ukraine
2009 - The gallery "Cobalt", Kyiv, Ukraine
2010 - The gallery "Cobalt", Kyiv, Ukraine
2010 - The gallery "Mystetska Zbirka", Kyiv, Ukraine
2011 - The gallery "KUMF", Toronto, Canada
2011 - The gallery "Mystetska Zbirka", Kyiv, Ukraine
2012 – ART - Monaco 2012, Monte Carlo, Monaco
2012 - The gallery "Mystetska Zbirka", Kyiv, Ukraine
2013 – Kiev national museum of Russian art, Kiev. Ukraine

Works in private collections 

Works are purchased by The Ministry of Culture of Ukraine (7 works), also are placed in the National Museum of Ukrainian Art funds, private collections of Ukraine, Russia, Canada and France.

Participating in competitions 

2001 – 1st place in the competition «Oriental Cherry is blooming», Uzhgorod, Ukraine
2004-2006 – participating in the Shatalin’s, Pyzikov and Zaretskiy prizes, the exhibition hall NAOMA, Kyiv, Ukraine

Literature 
 Mykhailo Deyak. Selected works from the collection of Mykhailo Vasylenko : exhibition catalogue 30.01–17.02.2018. Kyiv : Golden Section, 2018. 38 p.

External links 
 http://www.mikhailodeyak.com

Ukrainian painters
Ukrainian male painters
Living people
1984 births
People from Zakarpattia Oblast